Zhuifen is a railway station on the Taiwan Railways Administration  located in Dadu District, Taichung, Taiwan.

Train tickets from Zhuifen station to Chenggong station via the Chengzhui line are considered auspicious among students for having the double meaning of "success in getting a good grade." If pronounced slightly differently, it could also mean "success in getting married."

History
The station was opened on 11 October 1922.

Structure
 There are two island platforms at Zhuifen Station
 This is a wooden station. and it is now one of the city's historical sites.

Service
Zhuifen Station is primarily serviced by Local Trains (區間車).

See also
 List of railway stations in Taiwan

References

1922 establishments in Taiwan
Railway stations in Taichung
Railway stations opened in 1922
Railway stations served by Taiwan Railways Administration